Many fields of scientific research in the Soviet Union were banned or suppressed with various justifications. All humanities and social sciences were tested for strict accordance with historical materialism. These tests served as a cover for political suppression of scientists who engaged in research labeled as "idealistic" or "bourgeois". Many scientists were fired, others have been arrested and sent to Gulag. The suppression of scientific research began during the Stalin era and continued after his regime.

The consequences of ideologically-motivation persecution had dramatic effects on many fields of Soviet science.

Examples

Biology 

In the mid-1930s, the agronomist Trofim Lysenko started a campaign against genetics and was supported by Stalin. If the field of genetics' connection to Nazis wasn't enough, Mendelian genetics was also suppressed due to beliefs that it was "bourgeoisie science" and its association with the priest Gregor Mendel due to hostility to religion because of the Soviet policy of state atheism.

In 1950, the Soviet government organized the Joint Scientific Session of the USSR Academy of Sciences and the USSR Academy of Medical Sciences, the "Pavlovian session". Several prominent Soviet physiologists (L.A. Orbeli, P.K. Anokhin, A.D. Speransky, I.S. Beritashvily) were accused of deviating from Pavlov's teaching. As a consequence of the Pavlovian session, Soviet physiologists were forced to accept a dogmatic ideology; the quality of physiological research deteriorated and Soviet physiology excluded itself from the international scientific community. Later Soviet biologists heavily criticised Lysenko's theories and pseudo-scientific methods.

Cybernetics 

Cybernetics was also outlawed as bourgeois pseudoscience during Stalin's reign. Norbert Wiener's 1948 book Cybernetics was condemned and translated only in 1958. A 1954 edition of the Brief Philosophical Dictionary condemned cybernetics for "mechanistically equating processes in live nature, society and in technical systems, and thus standing against materialistic dialectics and modern scientific physiology developed by Ivan Pavlov". (However this article was removed from the 1955 reprint of the dictionary.) After an initial period of doubts, Soviet cybernetics took root, but this early attitude hampered the development of computing in the Soviet Union.

History 

Soviet historiography (the way in which history was and is written by scholars of the Soviet Union) was significantly influenced by the strict control by the authorities aimed at propaganda of communist ideology and Soviet power.

Since the late 1930s, Soviet historiography treated the party line and reality as one and the same. As such, if it was a science, it was a science in service of a specific political and ideological agenda, commonly employing historical negationist methods. In the 1930s, historic archives were closed and original research was severely restricted. Historians were required to pepper their works with references – appropriate or not – to Stalin and other "Marxist-Leninist classics", and to pass judgment – as prescribed by the Party – on pre-revolution historic Russian figures.

Many works of Western historians were forbidden or censored, many areas of history were also forbidden for research as, officially, they never happened. Translations of foreign historiography were often produced in a truncated form, accompanied with extensive censorship and corrective footnotes. For example, in the Russian 1976 translation of Basil Liddell Hart's History of the Second World War pre-war purges of Red Army officers, the secret protocol to the Molotov–Ribbentrop Pact, many details of the Winter War, the occupation of the Baltic states, the Soviet occupation of Bessarabia and Northern Bukovina, Western Allied assistance to the Soviet Union during the war, many other Western Allies' efforts, the Soviet leadership's mistakes and failures, criticism of the Soviet Union and other content were censored out.

The Katyn massacre was formally assigned to Nazi Germany but the subject was frequently concealed. Soviet famines were taboo.

Linguistics
At the beginning of Stalin's rule, the dominant figure in Soviet linguistics was Nikolai Yakovlevich Marr, who argued that language is a class construction and that language structure is determined by the economic structure of society.  Stalin, who had previously written about language policy as People's Commissar for Nationalities, read a letter by Arnold Chikobava criticizing the theory. He "summoned Chikobava to a dinner that lasted from 9 p.m. to 7 a.m. taking notes diligently." In this way he grasped enough of the underlying issues to oppose this simplistic Marxist formalism, ending Marr's ideological dominance over Soviet linguistics. Stalin's principal work in the field was a small essay, "Marxism and Linguistic Questions."

Pedology 
Pedology was a popular area of research on the basis of numerous orphanages created after the Russian Civil War. Soviet pedology was a combination of pedagogy and psychology of human development, that heavily relied on various tests. It was officially banned in 1936 after a special decree of the Central Committee of the Communist Party of the Soviet Union "On Pedolodical Perversions in the Narkompros System" on July 4, 1936.

Physics
In the late 1940s, some areas of physics, especially quantum mechanics but also special and general relativity, were also criticized on grounds of "idealism". Soviet physicists, such as K. V. Nikolskij and D. Blokhintzev, developed a version of the statistical interpretation of quantum mechanics, which was seen as more adhering to the principles of dialectical materialism. However, although initially planned, this process did not go as far as defining an "ideologically correct" version of physics and purging those scientists who refused to conform to it, because this was recognized as potentially too harmful to the Soviet nuclear program. As Krylov writes on the perils of ideological intrusion into science, "Stalin rolled back the planned campaign against physics and instructed Beria to give physicists some space; this led to significant advances and accomplishments by Soviet scientists in several domains.  However, neither Stalin nor the subsequent Soviet leaders were able to let go of the controls completely.  Government control over science turned out to be a grand failure, and the attempt to patch the widening gap between the West and the East by espionage did not help.  Today Russia is hopelessly behind the West in both technology and quality of life."

Sociology 
After the Russian Revolution, sociology was gradually "politicized, Bolshevisized and eventually, Stalinized". From 1930s to 1950s, the discipline virtually ceased to exist in the Soviet Union. Even in the era where it was allowed to be practiced, and not replaced by Marxist philosophy, it was always dominated by Marxist thought; hence sociology in the Soviet Union and the entire Eastern Bloc represented, to a significant extent, only one branch of sociology: Marxist sociology. With the death of Joseph Stalin and the 20th Party Congress in 1956, restrictions on sociological research were somewhat eased, and finally, after the 23rd Party Congress in 1966, sociology in Soviet Union was once again officially recognized as an acceptable branch of science.

Statistics 

The quality (accuracy and reliability) of data published in the Soviet Union and used in historical research is another issue raised by various Sovietologists. The Marxist theoreticians of the Party considered statistics as a social science; hence many applications of statistical mathematics were curtailed, particularly during the Stalin era. Under central planning, nothing could occur by accident. The law of large numbers and the idea of random deviation were decreed as "false theories". Statistical journals and university departments were closed; world-renowned statisticians like Andrey Kolmogorov and Eugen Slutsky abandoned statistical research.

As with all Soviet historiography, reliability of Soviet statistical data varied from period to period. The first revolutionary decade and the period of Stalin's dictatorship both appear highly problematic with regards to statistical reliability; very little statistical data was published from 1936 to 1956 (see Soviet Census (1937)). The reliability of data improved after 1956 when some missing data was published and Soviet experts themselves published some adjusted data for Stalin's era; however the quality of documentation deteriorated.

While on occasion statistical data useful in historical research might have been completely invented by the Soviet authorities, there is little evidence that most statistics were significantly affected by falsification or insertion of false data with the intent to confound the West. Data was however falsified both during collection – by local authorities who would be judged by the central authorities based on whether their figures reflected the central economy prescriptions – and by internal propaganda, with its goal to portray the Soviet state in most positive light to its very citizens. Nonetheless the policy of not publishing, or simply not collecting, data that was deemed unsuitable for various reasons was much more common than simple falsification; hence there are many gaps in Soviet statistical data. Inadequate or lacking documentation for much of Soviet statistical data is also a significant problem.

Theme in literature 
 Vladimir Dudintsev, The White Robes (1987; a 1988 USSR State Prize), a fictionalized version of the devastation which Lysenko wreaked on Soviet genetic study

See also 
 Academic freedom
 Antiscience
 Anti-intellectualism
 Censorship in the Soviet Union
 Deutsche Physik
 First Department
 Historical negationism
 Political correctness
 Politicization of science
 Science and technology in the Soviet Union
 Soviet historiography
 Alexander Veselovsky, a case of suppressed literary research
 Stalin and the Scientists

References

 Я. В. Васильков, М. Ю. Сорокина (eds.), Люди и судьбы. Биобиблиографический словарь востоковедов  жертв политического террора в советский период (1917–1991) ("People and Destiny. Bio-Bibliographic Dictionary of Orientalists – Victims of the political terror during the Soviet period (1917–1991)"),   Петербургское Востоковедение (2003). online edition

20th century in science
History of science
Censorship in the Soviet Union
Science and technology in the Soviet Union
Research in the Soviet Union
Politics of science
Anti-intellectualism
Denialism
Soviet cover-ups